The 2019 IHF World Women's Handball Championship, the 24th event hosted by the International Handball Federation, was held in Japan from 30 November to 15 December 2019.

The Netherlands won their first title after defeating Spain in the final.

Venues 
Kumamoto region was entrusted with the organization of the World Championship. Additionally the Japanese Organizing Committee will have a venue in Tokyo in order to prepare for the 2020 Olympic Games. Kumamoto has had a lot of experience with handball tournaments, hosting the 1997 Men's World Championships.

Qualification 

1. If countries from Oceania (Australia or New Zealand) participating in the Asian Championships finished within the top 5, they qualified for the World Championships. If they placed sixth or lower, the place would have been transferred to the wild card spot.

Qualified teams

Draw 
The draw was held on 21 June 2019 in Tokyo, Japan.

Seeding 
The seeding was announced on 19 June 2019. As organizer, Japan had the right to choose their group.

Referees 
17 referee pairs were selected.

Squads 

Each team consisted of up to 28 players, of whom 16 may be fielded for each match.

Preliminary round 
The schedule was announced on 3 July 2019.

Tiebreakers 
In the group stage, teams were ranked according to points (2 points for a win, 1 point for a draw, 0 points for a loss). After completion of the group stage, if two or more teams had scored the same number of points, the ranking was determined as follows:

Highest number of points in matches between the teams directly involved;
Superior goal difference in matches between the teams directly involved;
Highest number of goals scored in matches between the teams directly involved (or in the away match in case of a two-team tie);
Superior goal difference in all matches of the group;
Highest number of plus goals in all matches of the group;
If the ranking of one of these teams is determined, the above criteria are consecutively followed until the ranking of all teams is determined. If no ranking can be determined, a decision shall be obtained by IHF through drawing of lots.

During the group stage, only criteria 4–5 applied to determine the provisional ranking of teams.

All times are local (UTC+9).

Group A

Group B

Group C

Group D

President's Cup

21st–24th place playoffs

21st–24th place semifinals

23rd place game

21st place game

17–20th place playoffs

17–20th place semifinals

19th place game

17th place game

13–16th place playoffs

13–16th place semifinals

15th place game

13th place game

Main round

Group I

Group II

Final round

Bracket

Semifinals

Seventh place game

Fifth place game

Third place game

Final

Final ranking

All Star Team 
The All Star Team and MVP was announced on 15 December 2019.

Statistics

Top goalscorers

Top goalkeepers

Top assists

Notes

References

External links 

Official website
IHF website

2019
World Championship, Women, 2019
World Championship, Women
2019 in Japanese women's sport
World Championship, 2019
Sport in Kumamoto Prefecture
November 2019 sports events in Japan
December 2019 sports events in Japan